Gettin' That Guac is a studio album released by MessCalen on August 1, 2006.  Guest appearances on the album include Redman, Selau, Killa Tay, Keak Da Sneak, Click Clack Gang, Eddieboy, Slo-O & Ice-T.

Track listing
 "Intro"
 "I'm Wet"
 "I'm A Hustla" (featuring Redman) 
 "Here I" (featuring Selau) 
 "Say That Again"
 "M.O.B." (featuring Killa Tay and 151) 
 "In A Scaper Makin' Paper" (featuring Keak Da Sneak) 
 "Click Clackin'" (featuring Click Clack Gang) 
 "Military Thuggin'" (featuring Eddieboy & Slo-O) 
 "On Da' Corner" (featuring Ice-T) 
 "I'm A Pimp"
 "I Drank, I Smoke"
 "The Message"

Messy Marv albums
2006 albums
Albums produced by Cozmo